Located in the Chicama Valley, the El Brujo Archaeological Complex, just north of Trujillo, La Libertad Province, Peru, is an ancient archaeological site that was occupied from preceramic times. Considering the broad cultural sequencing, the Chicama Valley can be considered as an archaeological microcosm. The research benefits from the favourable environmental and topological conditions for material conservation.

Huaca Prieta is the earliest part of the complex but the biggest constructions on the site belong to the Moche culture. In this area, there are also the remains of the later Lambayeque and Chimú.

Early Intermediate Period
The development of the Brujo Archaeological Complex during the Intermediate Period falls within a context of early complex societies construction. During the Moche era, monumental religious and socio-political centers usually named huacas were built. Although the architecture, the iconography and the practice of sacrifice relate the Brujo Complex to a ceremonial, ritual and funerary site, the constructions are considered as the result of labor the “caciques” controlled. The huacas of the Early Intermediate Period (200 B.C. 600 A.D.) seem to have exerted a polymorphous and centrifugal power, yet the complex is located in a difficult weather condition area.

The Brujo Complex is represented by three major huacas. The Huaca Prieta mound dates back to the preceramic times. Huaca Cortada and Huaca Cao Viejo (the largest) are stepped truncated pyramids constructed at the northern corners of the terrace during the EIP. Building archaeology unveils seven phases of construction spanning the early and middle phases of Moche era.

Huaca Cao Viejo is famous for its polychrome reliefs and mural paintings, and the discovery of the Señora de Cao, whose remains are currently the earliest evidence for a female ruler in Peru. Both appeared in National Geographic magazine in July 2004 and June 2006. The site officially opened to the public in May 2006, and a museum exhibition was proposed for 2007.

Post-Moche Era
The abandonment of the Huacas at the end of the Early Intermediate Period could have been linked to the political instability and upheavals of the Southern sphere of the Moche. Some archaeologists also point out the extreme climatic events at the end of the Intermediate Period that could have led to the decline of the culture. However, the informations relating to the end of the period are limited. The Lambayeque Culture arose in the Chicama Valley around 900 A.D. before being successively incorporated in the Chimu and the Inca expansive empires. Nevertheless, The Brujo Archaeological Complex remained a ceremonial and funerary area dedicated to the collective memory.

17th-century
A 17th-century letter found during excavations at the site may contain translations of numbers written in Quingnam or Pescadora using the decimal system, the first physical evidence for the existence of these languages (if they are not different names for the same language). Archaeologists believe that the language was influenced by Quechua, an ancient tongue still spoken by millions of people across the Andes.

See also 

Moche
Sipán
Trujillo, Peru
Huanchaco

References 

 Titelbaum, Anne; Verano, John W. (advisor), « Habitual activity and changing adaptations at the El Brujo Archaeological Complex: A diachronic investigation of musculoskeletal stress and degenerative joint disease in the lower Chicama Valley of northern coastal Peru », ProQuest Dissertations and Theses | 2012
 Tate, James; Schreiber, Katharina J. (advisor), « The Late Horizon occupation of the El Brujo site complex, Chicama Valley, Peru », ProQuest Dissertations and Theses | 2007
  Quilter Jeffrey, « Moche: Archaeology, Ethnicity, Identity », Bulletin de l'Institut français d'études andines, 39 (2) | 2010, 225-241.
 Gwin, Peter, « Peruvian temple of doom: his hand grips a severed head, his fanged mouth snarls, and the decapitator god evokes the fearsome wrath of the Moche, a culture that ruled Peru's north coast a millennium before the Inca. In a remote complex of pyramid ruins known as El Brujo--the Wizard--archaeologists have found a trove of ceramics, reliefs, and bones that tell a bloody tale, National Geographic », Vol.206(1) | July, 2004 p. 102
 Régulo Franco Jordán, César Gálvez Mora y Segundo Vásquez Sánchez, « Graffiti mochicas en la huaca Cao Viejo, Complejo El Brujo », Bulletin de l'Institut Français d'Études Andines, Vol.30(2), | 1 January 2001, p. 359-395
 Velasquez, Jg, « Dedication and termination rituals in southern Moche public architecture, Latin American Anitquity », Vol.26(1) | 2015 Mar, p. 87-105

External links 

IBM Virtual Archaeology Site About El Brujo
National Geographic Map of El Brujo
The Huacas del Sol y de la Luna
Information about Visiting El Brujo
Video of letter discussed above

Moche sites
Moche culture
Cupisnique culture
Archaeological sites in La Libertad Region
Archaeological sites in Peru
Tourist attractions in La Libertad Region